Nouveau riche is a term used, usually in a derogatory way, to describe those whose wealth has been acquired within their own generation, rather than by familial inheritance. The equivalent English term is the "new rich" or "new money" (in contrast with "old money"). Sociologically, nouveau riche refers to the person who previously had belonged to a lower social class and economic stratum (rank) within that class; and that the new money, which constitutes their wealth, allowed upward social mobility and provided the means for conspicuous consumption, the buying of goods and services that signal membership in an upper class. As a pejorative term, nouveau riche affects distinctions of type, the given stratum within a social class; hence, among the rich people of a social class, nouveau riche describes the vulgarity and ostentation of the newly rich person who lacks the worldly experience and the system of values of "old money", of inherited wealth, such as the patriciate, the nobility, and the gentry.

History

The idea of nouveau riche dates at least as far back as ancient Greece. In the 6th century BCE, the poet and aristocrat Theognis of Megara wrote how "in former days, there was a tribe who knew no laws nor manners ... These men are nobles, now, the gentlemen of old are now the trash". In the Roman Republic, the term novus homo ("new man") carried similar connotations.

Social status
One can define social status in relation to wealth, and to the power granted by the wealth. It has been argued that the upper, ruling classes have legitimized "... their rule with claims of status and honor and moral superiority". Ruling classes make claims in defense of the ascribed superiority of wealth inherited through "blood ... and the concept of proper breeding".  The nouveau riche man and woman are juxtaposed against the people of the old money social class; and with trans-generational, inherited wealth, in order to highlight the cultural, value system and societal differences, between the two social groups within the class.

Old Family ties, as traditional claims of status, are not found in the nouveaux riches, which challenges and ultimately redefines social traditions and values such as the institution of debutantes and their debut to society.  As seen through the rise in the number of debutantes, the social value of the debut has since shifted from the "family's elite social standing and long family traditions" to "a symbolic value as an element of upper-class life style". This transition allows for high social standing to be established by the nouveau riche through the institution of the debut.  Social integration of these elite sects is extremely slow and sluggish, which prolongs and strengthens stereotypes.  This rate of integration makes it more likely that the nouveaux riches will "retain identification with the traditional ... group of origin; this is the basis for division between the groups.  Furthermore, the isolation that minority nouveaux riches experience within their own class leads them "to prioritize issues of radical justice, civil liberties, and religious tolerance over pure economic self-interest".

Inter-class stereotypes
Often referred to as parvenu, members of the nouveau riche are often discriminated against by the "old money" sects of society since they "lack the proper pedigree". These newcomers to economic power are subject to even greater scrutiny from their lack of historical prestige as seen through Dye's comments which reference the new rich as "uncouth" and "uncultured".  The behavior of the nouveau riche is often satirized by American society by "implying that stereotyped, rather than real, behavior patterns are copied".  

Many people have made claims to the inferiority of those with new money as compared to those with old money. Many have made claims that nouveaux riches "lack political and cultural sophistication" and others make comparisons saying that the old rich are "more sophisticated than the less cosmopolitan nouveau riche". These assumptions further perpetuate the differences between the two and lead to even further stereotypes and have lasted for well over a century. In 1929 Mrs. Jerome Napoleon Bonaparte, who herself married into a family that had once been considered parvenu and lacking in pedigree, protested that "the nouveau riche... is making places like Palm Beach no more exclusive than Coney Island. Newport, the last stronghold of the elite, has the moneyed intruder at the gates.... Undesirables are penetrating everywhere". In 18th-century Europe, "Old Money" families attempted to raise themselves above the nouveau riches by sensitively renovating their ancestral residences to allude to their antiquity. Their evident ties to the families' history could not be rivaled by the new, self-made, class. In the Dutch Republic the nobility sought this as an advantage over the merchant burghers of Amsterdam and a similar trend arose in the French Court. The same is true of the fashionable lairds of seventeenth century Scotland who re-worked buildings like Thirlestane Castle, Glamis Castle and Drumlanrig Castle to celebrate the lineage of their families.

Nouveau pauvre 
The term nouveau pauvre (French for "new poor") was coined to refer to a person who had once owned wealth, but has now lost all or most of it. This term is generally used to emphasize that the individual was previously part of a higher socioeconomic rank, and that such wealth that provided the means for the acquisition of goods or luxuries is currently unobtainable. These people may or may not actually be poor, but compared to their previous rank, it seems as if they are. Nicholas Monson (grandson of the 9th Baron Monson) and Debra Scott were authors of The Nouveaux Pauvres: A Guide to Downward Nobility (1984), "a lifestyle manual for poverty-stricken aristocrats" "running an aristocratic lifestyle on a tradesman's budget".

See also

 Parvenu
 Bourgeoisie
 Economic inequality
 Essex man
 Liberal elite
 New Russian
 Philistine
 Rags to riches
 Snob
 Sudden wealth syndrome
 Tuhao
 White shoe brigade

References

Class discrimination
French words and phrases
Class-related slurs
Social groups
Socio-economic mobility
Upper class culture
Wealth
Socioeconomic stereotypes

zh:新貴